A coronation is the crowning ceremony of a monarch.

Coronation may also refer to:

Places 
 Coronation, Alberta, a Canadian town
 Coronation, KwaZulu-Natal, Abaqulusi Local Municipality, South Africa
 Coronation, Mpumalanga, South Africa
 Coronation Glacier, a glacier on Baffin Island, Nunavut, Canada

Other uses
 Coronation (2000 film), a Chilean film
 Coronation (2020 film), a documentary film shot in China
 Coronation (grape), a table grape originating from Canada (also called Sovereign Coronation)
 Coronation Street, the world's longest-running television soap opera still in production
 HMS Coronation (1685)
 LMS Princess Coronation Class 6220 Coronation, first locomotive of the LMS Princess Coronation Class
 Coronation, tune by Oliver Holden, first published in 1779, used for the hymn "All Hail the Power of Jesus' Name"
 Coronation (British horse), a Thoroughbred racehorse, winner of the 1841 Epsom Derby
 Coronation (French horse), a Thoroughbred racehorse, winner of the 1949 Prix de l'Arc de Triomphe
 Coronation rock, a named rock on the planet Mars near the landing site of the Curiosity rover
 Coronations (women's cricket), a women's cricket team from South Africa
A kind of re-enactment event hosted by the Society for Creative Anachronism

See also 
 The Coronation (disambiguation)
 Coronation Park (disambiguation)
 Coronation Stakes (disambiguation)